Penyengat Island is an island in Tanjung Pinang, capital of the Riau Islands, Indonesia. It lies just off Bintan Island, close to the downtown of Tanjung Pinang. The island has historical significance, dating back to the 18th century, when it was established as a fort as part of the Sultanate of Johor-Riau by the Bugis people. The island contains the tomb of Raja Ali Haji, a 19th-century Bugis historian and scholar. It is a small island that is approximately 6 km from the downtown of Tanjung Pinang, Riau Islands province. This island measures approximately 2500 meters x 750 meters, and is approximately 35 km from the island of Batam. This island can be reached by using a boat or better known by pompong boat. By using pompong boat, it takes approximately 15 minutes drive.

Penyengat Island is a tourist attraction in Riau Islands. A few landmarks that may be visited are the Sultan Riau Great Mosque that is made from egg whites, the tombs of the Kings, the tomb of the national hero Raja Ali Haji, the Palace complex and blockhouse Office at Kursi Hill. Penyengat island is the perfect island to visit to explore the heritage of Malay culture.

During the reign of Sultan Riau, this island was used as headquarters ground in Malay land. It can be seen from the many historical relics of the past. Aside from being the headquarters of the government, the island was also a fortress forefront in retaliating the Dutch attack.

The evidence from the center of defense during the war is can be seen from the presence of a castle on the hill. The hill is known as Bukit Kursi. As a center of defense, it has some cannons that face the sea. The cannons are very strategically located, which can be used at any time when an enemy approaches.

References 

Riau Archipelago
Landforms of the Riau Islands
Islands of Sumatra